Lady Myeonghye of the Gaeseong Wang clan or known as Princess Myeonghye was a Korean Royal Princess as the only daughter of Hyejong of Goryeo and Palace Lady Yeon, also the only full younger sister of Wang Je.

References

Goryeo princesses
Year of birth unknown
Year of death unknown